Pentacta is a genus of echinoderms belonging to the family Cucumariidae.

The species of this genus are found in Indian Ocean, Malesia.

Species:

Pentacta doliolum 
Pentacta guinensis 
Pentacta hedingi 
Pentacta nipponensis 
Pentacta panamensis 
Pentacta peterseni 
Pentacta verrucula

References

Cucumariidae
Holothuroidea genera